The Louise Brooks Society is an internet resource - an online archive devoted to the silent film star Louise Brooks (1906–1985). The Louise Brooks Society, or LBS, was started in 1995 and launched on the web that same year. The stated goals of the LBS are to promote a greater awareness of the life and films of the celebrated actress, dancer, and writer.

According to its website, "The mission of the Louise Brooks Society is to honor the actress by stimulating interest in Louise Brooks' life and films, as well as her place in 20th century culture; by fostering and coordinating research on her life, films and writings; by serving as a repository for material relevant to the actress; and by advocating for the preservation and restoration of Louise Brooks' films and related material."

The site's online archive contains some 200 pages of material – including extensive bibliographies, a filmography, a chronology, commentary, vintage articles, memorabilia, portrait galleries, links, and contributions from individuals from around the world. The LBS bibliographies are its primary contribution to a growing body of scholarship concerning the actress.

The LBS also has a long-running blog, as well as its own online radio station, RadioLulu (which was part of Live365). Both were launched in 2002.

The LBS has helped bring both the Barry Paris biography of the actress and Louise Brooks' own book, Lulu in Hollywood, back into print through the University of Minnesota Press. It is so credited in each edition.

The society has also contributed material to various books published around the world, mounted an exhibit at the San Francisco Public Library and elsewhere, co-sponsored events including screenings and lectures, "inspired" the documentary Louise Brooks: Looking for Lulu, and helped generated media interest in the actress.

The society has also published three books, the "Louise Brooks edition" of Margarete Bohme's The Diary of a Lost Girl in 2010, and Beggars of Life: A Companion to the 1928 Film and Now We're the Air, both in 2017.

The efforts of the LBS has been written about in newspapers and magazines around the world including USA Today, The New York Times, The Times,  The Guardian, Melbourne Age, Stuttgarter Zeitung, and Le Temps. In 2005, at the time of its 10th anniversary, the film historian Leonard Maltin praised the LBS on his website.

The LBS website also serves as home to an internet-based, international fan club. At last count, its many members hail from 50 countries on six continents. Members of the LBS include film buffs, movie industry professionals, actors, writers, academics, artists, and other interested individuals from all walks of life.

References

External links
Official website
LBS blog

Sources

 
 
 

Film fan clubs
Celebrity fandom